Indygenat or 'naturalization' in the Polish–Lithuanian Commonwealth was the grant of nobility to foreign nobles. To grant indygenat, a foreign noble had to submit proof of their service to the Republic, together with proof of nobility issued by a foreign court, swear an oath of allegiance, and buy land. Grants of indygenat were limited in the history of Poland to just over 400 foreign nobles. It was granted by the King; after 1641 it was only valid with approval of the General sejm (parliament).

Bibliography
 Norman Davies, God's Playground A History of Poland: The Origins to 1795 (Vol. I), Oxford 2005, pp. 183-184

See also
Indigenat (disambiguation)
 Nobilitation
 Adopcja herbowa
 Skartabellat

External links
  Alphabetical Lists of naturalized non-citizens in Polish-Lithuanian Commonwealth during 1569-1792 

Legal history of Poland